Lionel Moise (December 31, 1888 – March 8, 1949) was an American college football player, coach, and official as well as an attorney.

Early years
His early education was secured in the public schools of Dallas, following which he attended St. Matthew's Academy, an Episcopal preparatory school. He later supplemented this training by attending Baylor University School in Chattanooga, from which he received a scholarship to the Sewanee:The University of the South.

Sewanee
Moise was a prominent tackle for the Sewanee Tigers football team; "one of the great names of Sewanee football history." At Sewanee he was a member of the Kappa Alpha fraternity.

1909
In 1909 the team won a conference championship. Moise was also the kicker on the squad. He was selected All-Southern.

Coaching career
He assisted Charley Moran with defense at Texas A&M in 1914. After serving as an assistant coach at a high school in Dallas (Terrill School), Moise assisted Ray Morrison at Southern Methodist in 1916. He was hired as head coach of Southwestern University in 1917.

References

1888 births
1949 deaths
American football placekickers
American football tackles
Basketball coaches from Texas
20th-century American lawyers
Sewanee Tigers football players
SMU Mustangs football coaches
Southwestern Pirates baseball coaches
Southwestern Pirates football coaches
Southwestern Pirates men's basketball coaches
Texas A&M Aggies football coaches
All-Southern college football players
Sportspeople from Dallas
Players of American football from Dallas